Joe Palooka in Winner Take All is a 1948 American film in the Joe Palooka series. It was directed by Reginald Le Borg.

Cast
 Joe Kirkwood, Jr. as Joe Palooka
 Elyse Knox as Anne Howe
 William Frawley as Knobby Walsh
 Stanley Clements as Tommy
 John Shelton as Greg Tanner
 Mary Beth Hughes as Millie
 Sheldon Leonard as Hermon
 Frank Jenks as Louie
 Lyle Talbot as Henderson
 Eddie Gribbon as Canvasback
 Wally Vernon as Taxi Driver
 Chester Clute as Doniger
 Douglas Fowley as Reporter
 Stanley Prager as Reporter 
 Tom Kennedy as Lefty
 Gertrude Astor as Mrs. Howard

External links
Joe Palooka in Winner Take All at TCMDB
Joe Palooka in Winner Take All at IMDb

1947 films
American black-and-white films
Films directed by Reginald Le Borg
Films based on American comics
American comedy-drama films
1947 comedy-drama films
1940s American films
Joe Palooka films